Epichloë elymi is a haploid sexual species in the fungal genus Epichloë. 

A systemic and seed-transmissible grass symbiont first described in 1999,  Epichloë elymi is a sister lineage to Epichloë bromicola.

Epichloë elymi is found in North America, where it has been identified in the grass species Bromus kalmii and Elymus spp., including E. patula, and as shown in the picture, E. virginicus.

References 

elymi
Fungi described in 1999
Fungi of North America